Risner is a surname. Notable people with the surname include:

 Dalton Risner (born 1995), American football player
 Friedrich Risner (c.1533–1580), German mathematician from Hersfeld, Hesse
 James Robinson Risner (1925–2013), United States Air Force general officer and fighter pilot

See also
 Risner, Kentucky